Jagriti Chadha (born 27 February 1965) is an Indian-born American designer and entrepreneur. She owns a chain of stores in New Delhi, India and the Web called Crazy Daisy

Biography 
Jagriti Chadha was born in New Delhi to Major Rajesh Chadha and artist Jogesh Singh Metge. She grew up in New Delhi and attended the Carmel Convent School. At 16 she moved to Manila and graduated from the American International School Manila. She went to study business management at Victoria University of Wellington in New Zealand and then completed an MBA at the Thunderbird School of Global Management in Arizona in 1992. She spent her last semester at Columbia University in New York during her MBA program. While at Thunderbird she wrote a business plan that became Flying Fig Corp.

Business career 
In 1996, Chadha joined Bayer as an analyst and was responsible for setting up their marketing team in Budapest. She went on to work at Maybelline, a division of L'Oreal, as a marketing director. In 1999, Chadha, with her mother Tito Metge, set up Flying Fig Corp in New York and established the brand as a "made in India" couture label that showcased original designs, revived Indian embroideries and competed with couture European labels in luxury home and women’s accessories stores such as Neiman Marcus and Fortnum & Mason. It was the only Indian company to provide gifts to the Oscars Gift Baskets and have their designs sold through the Metropolitan Museum of New York stores and catalogs.

In 2009, Chadha launched a new retail concept called Crazy Daisy. Through its stores in New Delhi Crazy Daisy retails whimsical home goods and clothing/accessories for girls of all ages.

Social contribution 
Flying Fig's mission is to revive and help revitalize the arts and crafts of India. Its works directly with independent craftsmen and NGOs that train destitute women (such as the Franciscan Sisters) and impoverished artisans providing them a substantial livelihood. Areas of empowerment include fine hand embroidery techniques and designs using techniques from the Mughal period, papier mache innovations, upcycled products using waste materials and unusual accessories and artifacts from individual artistes. The craftspeople tend to be from highly disadvantaged backgrounds.

References

External links 
 Articles on Flying Fig and Jagriti Chadha in US print media
 Times of India on Flying Fig and the Oscars
 India Today article on Flying Fig
 Crazy Daisy article in IndiaRetailing.com
 Time Out Delhi on Crazy Daisy
 Sari Nights review of Crazy Daisy
 Mint features Crazy Daisy
 Wassup Delhi reviews Crazy Daisy

1965 births
Living people
Businesswomen from Delhi
Indian emigrants to the United States
American people of Indian descent
American businesspeople
Victoria University of Wellington alumni
Thunderbird School of Global Management alumni
Columbia University alumni
American expatriates in India
21st-century American women